The Union of Construction Workers of Yugoslavia was a trade union representing workers in the construction industry in Yugoslavia.

The union was founded in 1945, soon becoming the Union of the Construction Industry and Building Workers of Yugoslavia, and it affiliated to the Confederation of Trade Unions of Yugoslavia.  By 1954, it had 155,410 members, growing to 387,000 by 1965.  In 1960, the union was renamed as the "Union of Construction Workers of Yugoslavia", but it returned to its earlier name in 1982.

The union split in 1990, into unions including the Independent Trade Union of Croatian Builders.

References

Building and construction trade unions
Trade unions established in 1945
Trade unions disestablished in 1990
Trade unions in Yugoslavia